Daniel Barbier (10 December 1907 – 1 April 1965) was a French astronomer born in Lyon.

Between 1930 and 1965 he published nearly 100 scientific papers on astronomy. Among his works were studies of stellar atmospheres and lunar occultations and eclipses. He performed studies of the upper atmosphere, Aurora Borealis, the zodiacal light and the night airglow.

His name remains associated to the famous Eddington-Barbier relationships of analytical radiative transfer (see Barbier 1943 and Paletou 2018).

Honors 
 The lunar crater Barbier was named after him in 1970.
 Asteroid 37853 Danielbarbier, discovered by Eric Elst at La Silla Observatory in 1998, was named in his honor. The official  was published by the Minor Planet Center on 5 October 2017.

References 
 

 
 
 

1907 births
1965 deaths
20th-century French astronomers
Recipients of the Lalande Prize